The River Nidd is a tributary of the River Ouse in the English county of North Yorkshire. In its first few miles it is dammed three times to create Angram Reservoir, Scar House Reservoir and Gouthwaite Reservoir, which attract a total of around 150,000 visitors a year. The Nidd can overflow the reservoirs, flooding the caves in the valley. In such cases the river overflows into the normally dry river bed past Lofthouse through to Gouthwaite Reservoir. The Yorkshire Dales Rivers Trust YDRT has a remit to conserve the ecological condition of the River Nidd from its headwaters to the Humber estuary.

The upper river valley, Nidderdale, was designated as an Area of Outstanding Natural Beauty in 1994.

Course

The Nidd rises in Nidderdale at Nidd Head Spring on the slopes of Great Whernside in the Yorkshire Dales. It flows east into Angram and Scar House reservoirs before turning south just downstream of Newhouses. In dry conditions the river disappears underground into the sinkhole known as Manchester Hole.  If Scar House reservoir overflows, water flows past Manchester Hole to Goyden Pot, another sinkhole. In severe floods, the river flows past Goyden Pot down the valley. The water sinking into the Nidderdale caves reappears at the rising Nidd Head to the south of the village of Lofthouse.

Below Lofthouse the river is joined by How Stean Beck, and turns south-south-east towards Ramsgill before flowing into Gouthwaite Reservoir. Continuing on the same heading, the first major settlement is reached at Pateley Bridge. Turning more south-easterly, it flows past Glasshouses and Summerbridge, where it turns south again past Dacre Banks. Passing by Darley, the river turns east before reaching Birstwith, where it flows south-east to Hampsthwaite. A series of large bends in the river take the flow north, east and then south, and east again, to enter Nidd Gorge.

Below the gorge, the river meanders south-east through the town of Knaresborough, heading north and looping south again as it enters flatter terrain. Near Little Ribston it meanders south-easterly and easterly, crossing underneath the A1 and the A1(M) near the small village of Cowthorpe. The river continues meandering past Cattal north-easterly towards Moor Monkton, towards its junction with the River Ouse at Nun Monkton.

Water levels

 Low and high water levels are an average figure.

Reservoirs

The two most northerly reservoirs on the course of the river were built to provide water to the Bradford area in the early 1900s by way of the Nidd Aqueduct. As of 2017, they are maintained by Yorkshire Water.

Angram Reservoir

The reservoir takes its name from Angram, a settlement in the township of Stonebeck Up, submerged when the reservoir was built.

Scar House Reservoir

A temporary village was built at Scar House to house the workers building the reservoirs and some remains can still be seen. The old Village Hall was moved to Darley, where it now serves as the local Village Hall. The dam at Scar House was completed in 1936. The dam height is 71 m (233 ft) with the reservoir covering area 70 hectares and a depth of giving a volume of 2,200 million gallons. The reservoir is fed almost exclusively from the Angram dam.

Gouthwaite Reservoir

Gouthwaite reservoir is designated a Site for Special Scientific Interest. It provides a compensation release for the river.

Geology

The head of the river is located on moorland and the river character is affected by the run-off levels from the three reservoirs. The upper valley is primarily millstone grit with fluvioglacial deposits. The overlying soil is prone to water-logging due to its slow permeability, being composed of loamy soils on top of clay with peat on the top layer. Around Lofthouse there are outcrops of Upper Yoredale limestone, which is more permeable than millstone grit and has created the Nidderdale Caves, where the river flows underground.

Lower down on the flood plain, the nature of the underlying ground is Magnesian Limestone over alluvium and terrace drift deposits.  On top of this is a combination of slowly permeable and well drained fine loam over clay.

Where the river passes through the Nidd Gorge, Carboniferous (Namurian) and Upper Permian rock is exposed.

Etymology
The etymology of the name remains unknown but the name is either Celtic or Pre-Celtic (as with most rivers in Western Europe). A derivation from Celtic meaning brilliant or shining has been suggested (as in Old Irish níamda), as has a link to the older Indo-European root *-nedi, simply meaning river.

The Nidd likely shares this etymology with the river and town of Neath (Welsh Nedd) in South Wales and the town of Stratton in Cornwall (originally named Strat-Neth), and with many other rivers across Europe, such as the Nete in Belgium, the Nied in France, the Nethe, Nidda and Nidder in Germany, and the Nida in Poland.

Leisure

Along the river valley can be found the Nidderdale Museum, which is located in Pateley Bridge, and features sections about the traditional agriculture, industries, religion, transport and costume of Nidderdale.

Lower down the river is the town of Knaresborough, which is home to Knaresborough Castle and Knaresborough Museum.

There are many way-marked walking routes throughout the river valley, including the Nidderdale Way, a 53-mile circular walk whose usual starting point is Ripley.

Lists

Tributaries

Above Angram Reservoir 
 Straight Dike
 Craven Sike
 Long Hill Sike
 Crook Dike

Flowing into Angram Reservoir 
 Stone Beck
 Maiden Gill Beck
 Haw Gill Sike
 Wising Gill Sike

Flowing into Scar House Reservoir 
 Wench Gill
 Shaw Gill Sike
 Stand Sike
 Tops Gill
 Scar House Gill

Between Scar House and Gouthwaite Reservoirs 
Woo Gill
 Thornet Gill
 Maddering Gill
 Turnacar Gill
 Foggyshaw Gill
 Rough Close Gill
 Limley Gill
 How Gill
 How Stean Beck
 Blayshaw Gill
 Blackstone Gill
 Boggle Dike
 Ramsgill Beck
 Lul Beck

Flowing into Gouthwaite Reservoir 
 Byerbeck Gill
 Knott's Gill
 Colt House Gill
 Riddings Gill
 Stubnooks Gill
 Burn Gill

Below Gouthwaite Reservoir 
 Dauber Gill
 Foster Beck
 Rash Dike
 Fosse Dike
 Byril Beck
 Fell Beck
 Loftshaw Gill
 Smelt Maria Dike
 Clough Gill
 Darley Beck
 Fringill Dike
 Old Mill Race
 Tang Beck
 Cockhill Beck
 Ripley Beck/Old Nidd
 Newton Beck
 Oak Beck
 Bilton Beck
 Frogmire Dike
 The Rampart
 Gundrifs Beck
 Crimple Beck/River Crimple
 Broad Wath
 Fleet Beck
 Kirk Hammerton Beck
 Pool Beck

Settlements

Lofthouse
Ramsgill
Wath
Pateley Bridge
Bewerley
Glasshouses
 Low Laithe
New York

Summerbridge
Dacre Banks
Darley
Birstwith
Hampsthwaite
Clint
Killinghall
Knaresborough

Little Ribston
Walshford
Cowthorpe
 Hunsingore
Cattal
Moor Monkton
Nun Monkton

Crossings

Angram Reservoir dam (private road)
Scar House Reservoir dam
 Woodale Bridge (private road to Low and Middle Woodale)
 Newhouses Bridge (unclassified road to Newhouses, Newhouses Edge and Summerstone Estate)
Thrope Farm road (private)
 Unclassified road at Lofthouse
 West House Farm road (private)
 Nidd Bridge, Ramsgill
 Wath Bridge, Wath
 B6265 at Pateley Bridge
 Unnamed road near Glasshouses (private)
 Glasshouses Bridge, Glasshouses
 B6451, Summer Bridge, Summerbridge
 Ross Bridge (Toll), near Birstwith
 New Bridge (packhorse bridge), near Birstwith
 Wreaks Bridge, Birstwith

 Hampsthwaite Bridge, Hampsthwaite
 A61, near Killinghall
 Killinghall Bridge, Killinghall
 Nidd Viaduct (Nidderdale Greenway), Bilton
 A59, High Bridge, Knaresborough
 Knaresborough Viaduct (railway), Knaresborough
 B6163, Low Bridge, Knaresborough
 B6164, Grimbald Bridge, Knaresborough
 A658, Knaresborough
 Goldsbrough Mill Farm Road
 A168, Walshford Bridge, Walshford
 A1M near Walshford
 Cattal Bridge, Cattal
 Skip Bridge, York to Harrogate/Leeds Railway Line near Kirk Hammerton
 A59, New Skip Bridge near Kirk Hammerton

Gallery

Sources

Ordnance Survey Maps

 Lower Wharfedale & Upper Washburn Valley (297)
 Nidderdale (298)
 Yorkshire Dales - Northern & Central Areas (OL 30)

References

Nidderdale
Rivers of North Yorkshire
1Nidd